The M1 MSBS was the first French submarine-launched ballistic missile.

Overview
In French, MSBS is the abbreviation for Mer-Sol Balistique Stratégique, or Sea-Ground Strategic Ballistic Missile. It has two stages. It was deployed on the Redoutable-class SNLEs (Sous-marin Nucléaire Lanceur d'Engins) (Device-launching Nuclear Submarine) or SSBNs from 1971 to 1975. It was replaced by the M2 MSBS in 1974–75.

References

Submarine-launched ballistic missiles of France
Nuclear weapons of France
Military equipment introduced in the 1970s